The  are a vocal group composed of Hironobu Kageyama and Masaaki Endoh as the fictional  and , respectively, debuting in 2997 (each year is 1000 years later than the actual date). Together, the Metal Brothers released two full-length albums of covers of anime songs and two singles of original songs. They have also performed various original songs for the Super Robot Wars series. The group has not released any more music since the inception of JAM Project.

Discography

Albums

Singles
"BRAVE HEART" (1998)
Used as the opening for

Other songs
"WONDER GENERATION!" (1998)
Insert song in Tetsuwan Tantei Robotack
"RIDE on DREAM" (1998)
"Far Away" (1998)
"MUTEKI Fight it out" (1998)

Insert songs in Bakusō Kyōdai Let's & Go!! MAX

See also
Hironobu Kageyama
Masaaki Endoh
Animetal
JAM Project

References

Rock music duos
Video game musicians
Japanese rock music groups
Anime musical groups
Japanese boy bands